Ballance may refer to:

 Ballance (video game), a 3D puzzle video game for Microsoft Windows
 Ballance, New Zealand, a farming community in Manawatū-Whanganui region of New Zealand's North Island
 Ballance Peak in Oates Land, Antarctica

People
 Bill Ballance (1918–2004), American radio talk show host
 Charles Alfred Ballance (1856–1936), English surgeon
 Chris Ballance (born 1952), Scottish playwright and politician
 Frank Ballance (1942–2019), American politician
 Gary Ballance (born 1989), Zimbabwean-born English test cricketer
 John Ballance (1839–1893), 14th Premier of New Zealand
 Ellen Ballance (1846–1935), New Zealand suffragist, community worker and wife of John Ballance
 Laura Ballance (born 1968), American bassist in the rock band Superchunk and co-founder of Merge Records
 Marshall Ballance (born 1978), American radio and advertising voice actor 
 Nancy Ballance, American politician

See also 

 Balance (disambiguation)